Olex and Olex2 are versatile software for crystallographic research. Olex used to be a research project developed during PhD to implement topological (as connectivity) analysis of polymeric chemical structures and still is widely used around the world. Olex2 is an open source project with the C++ code portable to Windows, Mac and Linux. Although the projects share the common name they are not related at the source code level.

Olex 
Olex program is designed for the analysis of extended structural networks. It only runs on Windows systems and source code is available only on request. It allows packing the structure, constructing the topological network and the evaluation of the networks Schläfli and vertex symbols and to produce raster pictures of the model visible on screen. This kind of the topological network analysis is normally done to find relevance of considered structures and possibly to predict physical properties of the investigated material.

Olex2 is a relatively new, open source software with a BSD licence which provides tools from the crystallographic structure solution to the final report preparation. It is still in the stage of active development. Olex2 platform independent GUI is provided by wxWidgets. Olex2 has an extended HTML based interface, enhanced by Pillow and OpenGL graphics. Olex2 provides numerous tools for the structure analysis and publication, including Fourier maps and voids calculation and visualisation, space group determination, calculation of esd's for almost any possible geometrical parameters, CIF translation to HTML and other documents, hydrogen atom placement and many others. Olex2 provides the final picture output as raster images or PostScript, Ortep-like or POV-Ray output. The software is provided as pre-build binaries for Windows, Mac and Linux as well as in the source code form. Several build scripts (SCons, CMake and make) are provided to help with the Olex2 development - but only SCons is supported throughout and used for each release update and any problems have to be addressed to the supporters. Olex2 is now supported by OlexSys Ltd.

As a GUI Olex2 is built from two components - the Olex2 core, written in C++ and exposing underlying model to the GUI, mostly based on the Python code. This segregation allows extending Olex2 with custom scripts and exploiting its functionality by the user at various levels - miller index operations, file manipulations and many others.

Olex2 provides a set of commercial extensions:
 3DPlus: provides a way to output STL, VRML and PLY files for 3D printing
 ReportPlus: professionally looking structure determination reports including the possibility to combine structures

Official Site 
http://www.olexsys.org

References

Crystallography software
Free science software
2003 software